This is a list of shootings in the United States that occurred in 2022. Mass shootings are incidents involving several victims of firearm-related violence. The precise inclusion criteria are disputed, and there is no broadly accepted definition.

Gun Violence Archive, a nonprofit research group that tracks shootings and their characteristics in the United States, defines a mass shooting as an incident in which four or more people, excluding the perpetrator(s), are shot in one location at roughly the same time. The Congressional Research Service narrows that definition to four or more killed and excludes the injured who survive. The Washington Post and Mother Jones use similar definitions, with the latter acknowledging that their definition "is a conservative measure of the problem", as many shootings with fewer fatalities occur. The crowdsourced Mass Shooting Tracker project applies the most expansive definition: four or more shot in any incident, including the perpetrator.

A 2019 study of mass shootings published in the journal Injury Epidemiology recommended developing "a standard definition that considers both fatalities and nonfatalities to most appropriately convey the burden of mass shootings on gun violence." The authors of the study further suggested that "the definition of mass shooting should be four or more people, excluding the shooter, who are shot in a single event regardless of the motive, setting or number of deaths."

Definitions 
 Stanford University MSA Data Project: three or more persons shot in one incident, excluding the perpetrator(s), at one location, at roughly the same time. Excluded are shootings associated with organized crime, gangs or drug wars.
 Mass Shooting Tracker: four or more persons shot in one incident, at one location, at roughly the same time.
 Gun Violence Archive/Vox: four or more shot in one incident, excluding the perpetrators, at one location, at roughly the same time.
 Mother Jones: three or more shot and killed in one incident at a public place, excluding the perpetrators. This list excludes all shootings the organization considers to be "conventionally motivated" such as all gang violence and armed robberies.
 The Washington Post: four or more shot and killed in one incident at a public place, excluding the perpetrators.
 ABC News/FBI: four or more shot and killed in one incident, excluding the perpetrators, at one location, at roughly the same time.
 Congressional Research Service: four or more shot and killed in one incident, excluding the perpetrators, at a public place, excluding gang-related killings and those done with a profit-motive.

Only incidents considered mass shootings by at least two of the above sources are listed below. Many incidents involving organized and gang violence are included.

List

Monthly statistics

Notes

References

External links 
 Gun Violence Archive Mass Shootings
 Mass Shooting Tracker Mass Shootings
 Mother Jones Mass Shootings
 USA Today Mass Shootings
 Vox Mass Shootings
 Washington Post Mass Shootings

 
2022 murders in the United States
Mass shootings in the United States
2022
2022